Werner Müller (born 7 September 1949) is a German mathematician. His research focuses on global analysis and automorphic forms.

Biography 

Werner Müller grew up in the German Democratic Republic (East Germany). He studied mathematics at the Humboldt University of Berlin in East Berlin. In 1977 he completed his PhD under the supervision of  Herbert Kurke. In his thesis, 
Analytische Torsion Riemannscher Mannigfaltigkeiten, he solved, at the same time as but independently of Jeff Cheeger, the Ray–Singer conjecture on the equality between analytic torsion and Reidemeister torsion. Thereafter he moved to the Karl-Weierstraß-Institut für Mathematik of the 
Academy of Sciences of the GDR. 
After the reunion of Germany he spent some time at the Max Planck Institute for Mathematics in Bonn. Since 1994 he is Professor at the Mathematics Institute of the University of Bonn.
He is the successor on the chair of Friedrich Hirzebruch.  He has supervised 12 doctoral students, including Maryna Viazovska.

Together with Jeff Cheeger, he has been awarded the 
Max-Planck-Forschungspreis in 1991
. 
The Cheeger–Müller theorem on the analytic torsion of Riemannian manifolds is named after them.

Important Papers

References

External links 
 —Conference in honor of his 60. birthday at the Hausdorff Center for Mathematics in Bonn
 —Conference in honor of his 60. birthday at the Hebrew University Jerusalem
Personal Homepage, Bonn University

20th-century German mathematicians
Differential geometers
Living people
1949 births
21st-century German mathematicians